Hemiptocha is a genus of moths of the family Crambidae.

Species
Hemiptocha agraphella Dognin, 1905
Hemiptocha argentosa (Snellen, 1893)
Hemiptocha atratellus (Hampson, 1919)
Hemiptocha chalcostomus (Dyar, 1916)

References

Chiloini